Pandikar Amin bin Mulia (Jawi: ڤنديكر أمين بن مليا; born 17 September 1955) is a Malaysian politician who has served as President of United Sabah National Organisation (New) (USNO Baru) since February 2021. He served as 8th Speaker of the Dewan Rakyat from April 2008 to April 2018, Minister in the Prime Minister's Department from December 1999 to November 2002, State Minister of Agriculture and Fisheries of Sabah from May 1997 to March 1999, State Minister of Culture, Youth and Sports of Sabah from March 1994 to May 1997, Member of the Sabah State Legislative Assembly (MLA) for Tempasuk from March 2004 to March 2008 and Usukan from 1982 to 1985 and President of the People's Justice Front (AKAR) from 1989 to 1995.

Early background 
Pandikar Amin was born in a remote village in Kota Belud, Sabah to ethnic Bajau Iranun farmer parents who were of poor backgrounds and started primary schooling in his hometown. Prior to going to England for tertiary education, he received education at Sabah College in Kota Kinabalu, a prestigious elite secondary school of the state. He was a graduate of Wolverhampton Polytechnic and Lincoln's Inn.

Political career

USNO 
Pandikar Amin entered politics in 1982 as a member of United Sabah National Organisation (USNO) and later picked as the Barisan Nasional (BN) parliamentary candidate for Kota Belud in 1982 general elections but lost to the Independent candidate. At the age of 27, however he became Sabah state assemblyman for Usukan from 1982 to 1985. He was appointed a non-MLA Speaker of Sabah State Legislative Assembly from 1986 to 1988.

AKAR 
Pandikar with some other  dissident United Sabah Party (PBS) of Dusun and Bajau ethnic-based leaders namely Mark Koding and Kalakau Untol formed the People's Justice Front (AKAR) in 1989. In 1999, he was appointed as a Senator and Minister in the Prime Minister's Department until 2002. He was president of AKAR, that had joined to be one of the BN component parties in Sabah, at that time. The party was dissolved to enable its members to join United Malays National Organisation (UMNO) in 2001.

UMNO and Speakership in the Dewan Rakyat 
Pandikar, as a member of UMNO was elected again Sabah assemblyman from 2004 to 2008; for Tempasuk. After the 2008 general elections, the BN coalition government announced that Pandikar, a non-MP would be the new Speaker, replacing Ramli Ngah Talib.

The 12th Parliament was the first to be presided over entirely by East Malaysians; Pandikar and his deputies, Wan Junaidi Tuanku Jaafar and Ronald Kiandee, hail from either Sabah or Sarawak. In mid-May, after Parliament convened, Pandikar resigned as Kota Marudu UMNO division chief, citing the need to be a neutral presiding officer. He denied his resignation was linked to possible party-switching amongst UMNO MPs from East Malaysia.

Ahead of the 2018 general elections, Pandikar announced his intention to contest, thus enable his possible prospect to be a more active federal-elected politician after serving as a non-MP Speaker for two terms. Somehow he was not picked as candidate to contest the elections that saw the downfall of BN in both the federal and state governments. Despite his appointment to the UMNO's supreme council later on 14 July 2018; he decided to quit UMNO on 12 December 2018 along with other Sabah UMNO assemblymen to be independents.

USNO Baru
Pandikar had joined USNO Baru and appointed its Chairman Strategic Advisory Council in July 2019. He then contested Pintasan state seat in September 2020 Sabah state election under USNO Baru but together with all the party candidates were defeated. Pandikar was officially elected party president in February 2021.

Election results

Honours
  :
  Companion of the Order of Loyalty to the Crown of Malaysia (JSM) (1992)
  Commander of the Order of Loyalty to the Crown of Malaysia (PSM) - Tan Sri (2002)

  :
  Grand Knight of the Order of the Territorial Crown (SUMW) - Datuk Seri Utama (2008)
  :
  Knight Grand Commander of the Order of the Defender of State (DUPN) - Dato' Seri Utama (2013)
  :
  Commander of the Order of Kinabalu (PGDK) - Datuk (1995)
  Grand Commander of the Order of Kinabalu (SPDK) - Datuk Seri Panglima (2010)

References 

1955 births
Living people
People from Sabah
Bajau people
Malaysian Muslims
20th-century Malaysian lawyers
United Sabah National Organisation politicians
Former United Malays National Organisation politicians
People's Justice Front politicians
Members of the Dewan Negara
Speakers of the Dewan Rakyat
Government ministers of Malaysia
Members of the Sabah State Legislative Assembly
Speakers of the Sabah State Legislative Assembly
Alumni of the University of Wolverhampton
Members of Lincoln's Inn
Commanders of the Order of Kinabalu
Grand Commanders of the Order of Kinabalu
Commanders of the Order of Loyalty to the Crown of Malaysia
Companions of the Order of Loyalty to the Crown of Malaysia
21st-century Malaysian politicians